Peter Scoones (27 October 1937 – 20 April 2014) was an underwater cameraman known for his oceanic photography. He took underwater photographs from 1959 until his death on 20 April, 2014.

Filmography
Earth - (Cinematographer/2009/Lensing/Awaiting Release)
Deep Blue - (Cinematographer/2005)

Awards
Brighton International Film Festival Gold Medal for the Best Amateur Film
Brighton International Film Festival Underwater Photographer of the Year (twice)
Birmingham Film Festival Best British Underwater Photographer (twice)

References

External links
Peter Scoones

1937 births
2014 deaths
Emmy Award winners
English underwater divers
Underwater photographers